Camille Kouchner (born 17 June 1975 in Paris), is a lawyer, French academic and lecturer in private law. With her book, La familia grande, she initiated the Duhamel scandal.

Biography 
Camille Kouchner was born on June 17, 1975, daughter of the doctor and politician Bernard Kouchner and the writer and political scientist Évelyne Pisier. She is the niece of the mathematician Gilles Pisier and of the actress and novelist Marie-France Pisier.

Following the divorce of her parents in 1984, she was partially brought up by her mother’s second husband, the political scientist Olivier Duhamel. She has two brothers, including a twin, as well as a half-sister and a half-brother adopted by her mother and Olivier Duhamel. In 2015, she clicked when she saw Mon roi, by Maïwenn, who had entrusted the role of her mother to her aunt Marie-France Pisier in Pardonnez-moi, which recounted the incestuous relationship between the director and her stepfather.

At the beginning of January 2021, in her book La Familia grande, Camille Kouchner accuses her stepfather of incest, rape and sexual assault “repeated for years”, Olivier Duhamel, second husband of her mother Évelyne Pisier: she tells us that, from 1988 to 1989, her stepfather regularly abused her twin brother (renamed Victor in the book) during their adolescence.

References

21st-century French lawyers
French women lawyers
1975 births
Living people
French academics
21st-century French women writers
Lycée Henri-IV alumni